Jessica Zelinka (born 3 September 1981 in London, Ontario) is a Canadian pentathlete, heptathlete, and 100 m hurdler.  Her personal best score is 6599 points for the heptathlon. She was the gold medalist at the 2007 Pan American Games. Zelinka won silver at the 2010 Commonwealth Games and repeated her silver medal at the 2014 Commonwealth Games. At the 2012 Summer Olympics Zelinka finished in 6th overall in the heptathlon and 7th in the 100 m hurdles.

Career
Zelinka first became interested in track and field in elementary school and competed in her first heptathlon at 16. She missed much of the 1999 outdoor season because of an illness. Her first international competition was the 2000 IAAF World Junior Championships in Athletics, where she was fifth in the heptathlon and also competed in the heats of the 100 meter hurdles. She missed most of the 2002 season due to a back and hamstring injury. Zelinka's first major global outing came at the 2005 World Championships in Athletics and she finished in eleventh place. She just missed out on the medals at the 2006 Commonwealth Games having finished in fourth place.

Regional success came at the 2007 Pan American Games as she fended off Gretchen Quintana, among others, to top the podium and take the gold medal. She set a new personal best and Canadian record points score for heptathlon, with 6343. She was selected for the 2007 World Championships in Athletics, but did not compete. 

She finished in fifth place at the 2008 Summer Olympics. This equalled the best place finish of a Canadian woman in a multi-events sport at the Olympics. At the Beijing Olympics, she set a new Canadian record for heptathlon, with 6490 points. After her Olympic appearance, she took the 2009 season off from competition and had a daughter with her partner Nathaniel Miller, a Canadian international in water polo.

Building up to the 2010 Commonwealth Games, she finished third in the heptathlon at the Décastar meeting in Talence, France. She earned a season's best total of 6204 points. At the games Zelinka was battling the traveler's diarrhea that affected many athletes in Delhi. Despite the challenges she managed to finish a respectable second and win the silver. Though she did medal Zelinka admitted some disappointment as she had gone to Delhi to win gold. Zelinka's medal was notable however as she just had a baby the previous year and had taken that season off and only returned to competition in 2010.

As of 2012, Zelinka's coach is Les Gramantik. During the 2012 Canadian Olympic trials for track and field, she set a new personal best, of 6599 points, and new Canadian record score for heptathletes, on 28 June 2012, besting her old personal best and Canadian record, set at the 2008 Olympics. This selected her for the 2012 London Olympics for heptathlon. Two days later, she finished first in the 100 m hurdles, qualifying her for that event as well. She had considered foregoing it to concentrate on the heptathlon, but decided to compete in both events. At the 2012 London Olympics, Zelinka finished 7th overall in both the Women's Heptathlon event and the 100 m hurdles.

Zelinka competed at the 2014 Commonwealth Games following a couple years away from the sport, there she won silver behind teammate Brianne Theisen-Eaton.

Results

Honours
In 2012 Zelinka was awarded the Queen Elizabeth II Diamond Jubilee Medal.

References

External links
 Official Website
 
 Profile at Athletics Canada

1981 births
Living people
Athletes (track and field) at the 2006 Commonwealth Games
Athletes (track and field) at the 2008 Summer Olympics
Athletes (track and field) at the 2012 Summer Olympics
Canadian heptathletes
Olympic track and field athletes of Canada
Athletes from London, Ontario
Track and field athletes from Ontario
Athletes (track and field) at the 2007 Pan American Games
Athletes (track and field) at the 2010 Commonwealth Games
Commonwealth Games silver medallists for Canada
Canadian female hurdlers
Athletes (track and field) at the 2014 Commonwealth Games
Athletes (track and field) at the 2015 Pan American Games
Pan American Games gold medalists for Canada
Commonwealth Games medallists in athletics
Pan American Games medalists in athletics (track and field)
World Athletics Championships athletes for Canada
Medalists at the 2007 Pan American Games
Medallists at the 2010 Commonwealth Games
Medallists at the 2014 Commonwealth Games